The Island Field Site (7K-F-17) is a major archaeological site in Kent County, Delaware, United States.  The site is located in South Bowers, just south of the Murderkill River near where it empties into Delaware Bay.  The site was a major prehistoric Native American village site, which was most notable for its cemetery.  The site was first identified in the 1920s during road work, and was excavated in the 1950s-60s, after which the area was eventually built up to include a museum.  In 1986 members of the local Nanticoke tribe protested the display and removal for research of burial remains at the site.

The site was listed on the National Register of Historic Places in 1972.

See also
National Register of Historic Places listings in Kent County, Delaware

References

Archaeological sites on the National Register of Historic Places in Delaware
Kent County, Delaware
National Register of Historic Places in Kent County, Delaware